Patrick Mambwe (born 8 June 1944 in Kitwe) is a Zambian professional fly/super fly/bantam/super bantam/featherweight boxer of the 1960s and '70s who won the Zambia bantamweight title, and Commonwealth flyweighttitle, his professional fighting weight varied from , i.e. flyweight to , i.e. Featherweight.

Managed by legendary (and controversial) Zambian-based Nigerian Gibson Nwosu, who was also a promoter and referee, Patrick Mambwe was probably the most disciplined and hardest-working of all professional boxers Zambia has ever had. Mambwe holds a special place in the history of Zambian boxing. In 1976, he became the first boxer in Zambia to win a Commonwealth title after stopping Australian Gwynne Jones in the sixth round of a flyweight contest. Two years later, Mambwe won the African Boxing Union (ABU) bantamweight title when Ivorian champion, 42-year-old Baba De Keita, came out of his dressing room refusing to fight him and simply handing over the belt. It was also the first time a Zambian boxer won an African championship. Furthermore, Mambwe became the first boxer to hold the two titles simultaneously. Lottie Mwale and John "Big Joe" Sichula were the second and third respectively to grab the two belts. They also each held both championships at the same time.

Patrick Mambwe had a full-time job at the Zambia Consumer Buying Corporation (ZCBC), a state enterprise, in Kitwe. He was said to be a gentleman and family-oriented. In the ring, he combined power, speed and unfaltering determination. In his amateur and early pro-career days, he trained with the likes of Fix Njilamanda, a highly-respected fellow Zambian pugilist. 

Perhaps the most memorable and toughest of all of Mambwe's fights was against fast, stubborn Ghanaian Haruna Chico at Rokana Mine Hall in Kitwe. Relentlessly exchanging sleek, sharp, damaging punches, the two boxers were generally tied until Chico finally buckled in a late round of a fifteen-round ABU championship encounter.

The career and life of the indomitable Patrick Mambwe took a turn for the worse when Gibson Nwosu took him to London for a Commonwealth flyweight title defence against Briton Charlie Magri. Mambwe failed the medical examination. According to reports, British Physician McDonald Critchley revealed a cataract in one eye. The fight could not take place. Mambwe underwent surgery in Kitwe. However, while he still had bandages round his head, he suffered a night attack in which the eye that had been operated on was also affected, jeopardising full recovery. He never fought again. It was a sad end to the career of a true and pioneering Zambian champion.

References

External links

1944 births
Bantamweight boxers
Featherweight boxers
Flyweight boxers
Living people
People from Kitwe
Super-bantamweight boxers
Super-flyweight boxers
Zambian male boxers